Relic woods is a natural monument (Protected areas of Ulyanovsk Oblast).

Basic features of nature

Contains two areas:
1.22 metres high vegetation, consists of linden (near 90%) and birch (near 10%) trees. The store of woodpulp are 310 cube metres at 1 hectare. Square: 48,8 hectares.
2.23 metres high vegetation, consists of linden (near 90%) and birch (near 10%) trees. The store of woodpulp are 380 cube metres at 1 hectare. Square: 11,3 hectares.
Another rocks: maple, filbert.
All manage works are prohibited with the aim to save value vegetation. Researching and scientific work is not conducing.

Basis for creation and its importance 

interest represent radical lime woods age of 80–100 years.

References
 https://web.archive.org/web/20071231205649/http://eco.ulstu.ru/
 

Natural monuments
Protected areas of Russia